The Pamisos is the largest river of the Messenia regional unit of the southern Peloponnese in Greece. Its source is on the western slopes of the Taygetus mountains, near the village Agios Floros. It runs through the municipal units of Arfara, Ithomi, Androusa, Aris, Messini, Thouria and Kalamata. It flows into the Messenian Gulf east of Messini and west of Kalamata.

References

See also
List of rivers in Greece

Landforms of Messenia
Rivers of Greece
Rivers of Peloponnese (region)
Drainage basins of the Ionian Sea